Joseph Russell Pitts (born October 10, 1939) is a former American politician who served as the U.S. representative for  from 1997 to 2017. He is a member of the Republican Party. The district was based in Lancaster and Reading and included much of the Amish country. It also included the far southwestern suburbs of Philadelphia in Chester County.

In December 2015, Congressman Pitts announced he would not run for reelection in 2016.

Early life and education
Pitts was born in Lexington, Kentucky and graduated from Asbury College. Pitts served five and a half years in the United States Air Force, with three tours in Vietnam. Initially commissioned as a second lieutenant, he was promoted to captain by the time he left the service. He graduated second in his class from Navigator School, after which he was trained as an electronic warfare officer. As an EW officer, he served on B-52 Stratofortresses out of Westover Air Force Base, Massachusetts, with payloads of nuclear bombs. In all, he completed 116 combat missions in the Vietnam War and earned an Air Medal with five oak leaf clusters.

Career
After leaving the Air Force in 1969, Pitts moved to Kennett Square, Pennsylvania, a suburb of Philadelphia and the hometown of his wife, Ginny. They built a house there, where they still live today.

Pitts was elected to the Pennsylvania House of Representatives in 1972, representing Kennett Square and surrounding areas of southeastern Chester County.

U.S. House of Representatives

Elections
After 10-term Republican congressman Bob Walker decided to retire in 1996, Pitts jumped into the crowded five-candidate Republican primary—the real contest in what has long been a strongly Republican district. He won the primary with 45% of the vote, defeating the second place candidate by 19 percentage points. In the general election, he defeated Democrat James G. Blaine 59%–38%.

He won re-election easily in 1998 (71%), 2000 (67%), 2002 (88%), and 2004 (64%).

2006

Pitts originally promised to serve only 10 years (five terms), but announced he would run again in 2006 amid considerable controversy. Despite the controversy, Pitts won re-election to a sixth term, defeating Democratic businesswoman Lois Herr 57%–40%. The seventeen-point margin was the second smallest margin in his career.

2008

In 2008, Pitts decided to seek a seventh term. He was challenged by Navy veteran and construction contractor Bruce Slater. Pitts defeated him 56%–39%. The sixteen-point margin was the smallest margin in his career.

2010

Pitts was challenged by Democrat Lois Herr for a third rematch. He won re-election to an 8th term, defeating her 65%–35%.

2012

Pitts was challenged by Democrat businesswoman Aryanna Strader and Independent Jim Bednarski In the general election, Pitts won re-election to a ninth term, defeating Strader 55%–39%. The sixteen-point margin is tied for 2008 in being the smallest margin in his career. He lost in Berks County by 12,000 votes (35%) and won Chester County by only 500 votes (1%). He won Lancaster handily with over 60% of the vote.

Tenure
Pitts has a very conservative voting record, which is not surprising given that his district has historically been one of the most Republican districts in the Northeast.  However, redistricting made the 16th somewhat less Republican.  The old 16th had a Cook Partisan Voting Index of R+8, but since the 2010 round of redistricting, it had a PVI of R+4.  He received 100% ratings from the American Conservative Union in 2005 and the Christian Coalition of America in 2004.

In 2002, after a federal judge ordered the removal of the Ten Commandments from the Chester County courthouse, Pitts released a press statement that said, "I think that religion and the Ten Commandments in particular should have a role in our public life" and supported The Ten Commandments Defense Act (H.R. 2045). Since his first term Pitts has been chairman of the Values Action Team, a subgroup of the Republican Study Committee that coordinates legislation with the Christian right.

Over the years Pitts has received 100% ratings from the U.S. Chamber of Commerce and 0% ratings from Public Citizens Congress Watch. In 2008 the ACLU gave him an 18% rating, the Human Rights Campaign gave him a score of 0%, and the Leadership Conference on Civil Rights gave him a score of 4%. In 2007–08 the John Birch Society gave him a score of 67%, and the American Conservative Union gave him a 100% rating, as did the Christian Coalition. Others: American Association of University Women, 2007–08, 16%; Republicans for Environmental Protection, 7% in 2007; and the Children's Health Fund, 2007–08, 0%; National Rifle Association, 2008, A; Brady Campaign to Prevent Gun Violence, 2003, 0%; National Breast Cancer Coalition, 2007–08, 0%; Children's Health Fund 2007–08, 0%. Ratings from labor groups are consistently at or near 0%; the Alliance for Worker Freedom, 2008, 100%.

Pitts visited Afghanistan after the fall of the Taliban and Pakistan in 2002. He visited Kuwait, Jordan, Iraq, and Israel in 2008 as part of a Congressional Delegation. He is a leading congressional advocate of nuclear power, and "introduced a bill in 2009 to fast-track the regulatory process for approving new reactors, he called it the 'Streamline America's Future Energy (SAFE) Nuclear Act.'"

Pitts is an advocate of a federal prohibition of online poker.  In 2006, he cosponsored H.R. 4411, the Bob Goodlatte-Jim Leach Internet Gambling Prohibition Act and H.R. 4777, the Internet Gambling Prohibition Act.

The Stupak–Pitts Amendment is an amendment to America's Affordable Health Choices Act of 2009 written by Pitts and Democrat Bart Stupak of Michigan, and it inserted abortion into the national health overhaul debate. This amendment continues his longtime opposition to abortion. According to Jeff Sharlet, a contributing editor for Harper's, Pitts is a documented member of the Bible-oriented Christian group "The Fellowship (Christian organization)" and the C Street group in Washington, D.C.

In the 112th Congress, Pitts introduced the Protect Life Act, which would place additional restrictions on abortion access.

In July 2011, Pitts was revealed, in course of an FBI investigation, to have accepted tainted funds traced to the intelligence services of Pakistan. These funds were routed through the so-called Kashmiri American Council (KAC), run by Syed Ghulam Nabi Fai, who was convicted of several felonies by the Federal government.

In October 2015, Pitts was named to serve on the Select Investigative Panel on Planned Parenthood.

Legislation
On March 26, 2014, Pitts introduced the Protecting Access to Medicare Act of 2014 (H.R. 4302; 113th Congress) into the House. The bill would delay until March 2015 the pending cut to Medicare, a cut that has been regularly delayed for over a decade. The bill would not offset this spending with increased revenue or cuts to spending in other places, a source of controversy. Pitts said he still supports a permanent fix to the Sustainable Growth Rate (SGR) formula and is "sponsoring this bill today because it is my earnest hope that this is the last patch we will have to pass."

On May 29, 2014, Pitts introduced into the House the Designer Anabolic Steroid Control Act of 2014 (H.R. 4771; 113th Congress), a bill that would expand the list of anabolic steroids regulated by the Drug Enforcement Administration (DEA) to include about two dozen new substances and would establish new crimes relating to false labeling of steroids. This type of steroid enhances muscles. The bill would establish a penalty of up to $500,000 against those found to be falsely labeling their anabolic steroid products.

Committee assignments
 United States House Committee on Energy and Commerce
 United States House Energy Subcommittee on Environment and Economy
 United States House Energy Subcommittee on Health (Chairman)
 Commission on Security and Cooperation in Europe

Caucus memberships
 Republican Study Committee
 Congressional Constitution Caucus

Electoral history

Personal life
Joe and his wife Ginny have three children as well as four grandchildren.

Bibliography

References

External links

 
 
 

|-

|-

|-

1939 births
21st-century American politicians
United States Air Force personnel of the Vietnam War
American evangelicals
Asbury University alumni
Living people
Republican Party members of the Pennsylvania House of Representatives
People from Kennett Square, Pennsylvania
Politicians from Lexington, Kentucky
Recipients of the Air Medal
Republican Party members of the United States House of Representatives from Pennsylvania
United States Air Force officers
Military personnel from Pennsylvania
Politicians from Chester County, Pennsylvania